Rajoli was an estate situated at Sakoli tahsil in the District Of Bhandara in the Indian state of Maharashtra.

References

Cities and towns in Bhandara district
History of Maharashtra
Central Provinces and Berar